Robert Winthrop Kean (September 28, 1893 – September 21, 1980) was an American Republican Party politician and member of one of the nation's oldest and longest serving political families. 

Kean represented parts of Essex County, New Jersey in the United States House of Representatives from 1939 to 1959. Kean retired from the House to run for United States Senate in 1958 but was defeated by Harrison A. Williams.

His son, Thomas Kean, later served as Speaker of the New Jersey General Assembly and Governor of New Jersey from 1982 to 1990.

Early years
Kean was born September 28, 1893, in Elberon, New Jersey. His father, Hamilton Fish Kean (1862–1941), was a United States Senator from New Jersey and his son, Thomas Kean, served two terms as the Governor of New Jersey.  Robert Kean was the great-great-grandson of  John Kean, a Delegate to the Continental Congress from South Carolina (1756–1795). His uncle, John Kean (1852–1914), was also a United States Senator from New Jersey. His grandson, Thomas Kean, Jr., is presently the Minority Leader of the New Jersey State Senate. His mother, Katherine Taylor Winthrop (1866–1943), was a descendant of John Winthrop, a wealthy English Puritan lawyer and one of the leading figures in the founding of the Massachusetts Bay Colony, the first major settlement in what is now New England after Plymouth Colony. Winthrop led the first large wave of migrants from England in 1630 and served as governor for 12 of the colony's first 20 years of existence. Kean is also a descendant of William Livingston, the first Governor of New Jersey.

His maternal great-grandfather was Moses Taylor (1806–1882), a 19th-century New York merchant and banker and one of the wealthiest men of that century. At his death, his estate was reported to be worth $70 million, or $ in  dollars. He controlled the National City Bank of New York (later to become Citibank), the Delaware, Lackawanna & Western railroad, the Moses Taylor & Co. import business, and he held numerous other investments in railroads and industry. His real estate holdings in New York brought him into close association with Boss Tweed of New York's Tammany Hall, and in 1871, Taylor sat on a committee made up of New York's most influential and successful businessmen and signed his name to a report that commended Tweed's controller for his honesty and integrity, a report that was a notorious whitewash.

He was a 1911 graduate of St. Mark's School and a 1915 graduate of Harvard University. He served in the National Guard and later in the United States Army during World War I earning the rank of lieutenant, the Silver Star, and the Distinguished Service Cross. He served under the command of General John J. Pershing.

Kean became involved in politics at a young age. In 1905, His uncle got him appointed as a U.S. Senate page so he could observe the Inauguration of President Theodore Roosevelt. He attended the 1912 Republican National Convention, where he was escorted by his uncle's secretary, Donald H. McLean, with whom he would late serve in Congress. Young Kean was a Roosevelt supporter, although his uncle and father had publicly endorsed the incumbent President, William Howard Taft. After he returned from the war, Kean took on campaign responsibilities on behalf of his father, who was the Republican National Committeeman from New Jersey from 1918 to 1928. He was heavily involved in his father's successful campaign for the U.S. Senate in 1928, and his unsuccessful 1934 re-election bid.

After the war, Kean worked in investment banking in New Jersey and New York City, heading a firm known as Kean, Taylor & Company. He was a founder of the Livingston National Bank.

U.S. Congressman
Kean became a candidate for the U.S. House of Representatives in 1938, running in New Jersey's 12th congressional district, which was based in Essex County.  Republicans had held the seat from 1914 until 1936, when Democrat Frank W. Towey, Jr. won it on the coattails of President Franklin Roosevelt's re-election. The seat was viewed as likely to return Republican, and six Republicans sought the nomination in the September 20 primary. Kean won by a narrow 713 vote margin, 13,923 to 13,210 over Montclair Town Commissioner Dallas S. Townsend.  Kean was endorsed by the "Clean Government" faction of the Essex GOP, while Townsend had the backing of the "Suburban Republican" faction. In the General Election, Kean defeated Towey by 12,118 votes, 48,854 (55%) to 36,736 (41%).

Kean was re-elected in 1940 (54%), 1942 (61%), 1944 (51%), 1946 (64%), 1948 (51%), 1950 (53%), 1952 (55%), 1954 (53%), and 1956 (60%). He was not a candidate for re-election to an 11th term in 1958 and was succeeded by Republican George M. Wallhauser.

During his twenty years as a Congressman, Kean was the Ranking Minority Member of the House Ways and Means Committee and served on the House Banking and Currency Committee. He was considered an expert on Social Security and Taxation law, and was called "Mr. Social Security" in Washington. Kean voted in favor of the Civil Rights Act of 1957.

Campaign for U.S. Senate
Kean was close to announcing his candidacy for the United States Senate in 1954. By early 1954, New Jersey Republican leaders had decided to withdraw party support for the incumbent Senator, Robert C. Hendrickson. Two Republicans, former U.S. Rep. Clifford Case and former New Jersey State Treasurer Walter Margetts had already announced their candidacies. Kean wanted tor run and had secured commitments of endorsements from several key GOP leaders, but he refused to announce his own campaign until Hendrickson declared his intentions publicly. Hendrickson waited until the day before the filing deadline to say he was retiring. That was too late for Kean, who filed as a candidate for re-election to the House.

U.S. Senator H. Alexander Smith decided not to seek re-election in 1958 and Kean became a candidate for the open seat in the United States Senate. He won the Republican Primary by 23894 votes over Bernard M. Shanley, who had served as Deputy Chief of Staff to President Dwight Eisenhower. Kean received 152,884 votes (43.00%) to 128,990 (36.28%) for Shanley. Robert J. Morris, who had served as Chief Counsel to the United States Senate Subcommittee on Internal Security, finished third with 73,658 votes (20.72%).

The 1958 Election occurred in the middle of President Eisenhower's second term. As is common in midterm elections, the party in the White House lost seats, but losses that year were on a huge scale, perhaps due to the high unemployment of the Recession of 1958. The Eisenhower Administration's position on "right-to-work" issues galvanized labor unions which supported Democrats. The launch of Sputnik may also have been a factor. The Democratic Party took thirteen Republican seats (10 of them by defeating incumbents), and also won both Senate seats in the new state of Alaska. Senate elections in 1959 in the new state of Hawaii were split between the two parties; combined with the 1958 results, this yielded an aggregate gain of 16 seats for the Democrats for a party balance of 65-35. This was the second-largest swing in the history of the Senate, only behind the Republican gains of 18 seats in 1866, and is only the third time in U.S.history that 10 or more Senate seats changed hands in a midterm election (after 1866 and 1946).

Kean was unable to buck the national political tide, and lost the General Election to Democrat Harrison A. Williams, a former Congressman.  Kean lost by 84,545 votes, 966,832 (51.39%)to 882,287 (46.90%).

Essex County Republican Chairman
Kean made a political comeback in 1959, challenging incumbent William Yeomans for Essex County Republican Chairman. Essex County Republicans were divided into two factions; Kean organized a slate of reform candidates opposed to Yeomans headed by Alfred C. Clapp, a popular former State Senator and Superior Court Judge. Yeomans backed Essex County Prosecutor Charles V. Webb, Jr. for the State Senate, but Clapp won the nomination by a massive 20,000 vote margin (72%-28%). All twelve Assembly candidates running on the Kean/Clapp line won the primary. Yeomans dropped his re-election bid, clearing the way for Kean to take over what was viewed as the most powerful Republican organization in the state. Among the political newcomers who ran on the Clapp ticket was C. Robert Sarcone.

Kean had a tough time as a party leader.  Democrats held the Essex County State Senate seat, with incumbent Donal C. Fox defeating Clapp in the General Election; Democrats won five of Essex County's twelve Assembly seats in 1959, and eight of the nine seats in 1961. Kean backed the losing candidate in the 1961 Republican gubernatorial primary, Bergen County State Senator Walter H. Jones. A Kean rival, former U.S. Attorney William F. Tompkins, challenged Kean for re-election in 1961 after Tompkins' candidate, former U.S. Secretary of Labor, James P. Mitchell, won the gubernatorial nomination. Kean beat Tompkins, 409 to 268.

Kean stepped down as County Chairman in 1962 and endorsed former Livingston Mayor Andrew C. Axtell as his successor. Tompkins ran again, but Axtell beat him 438 to 416.

Personal life and death
Kean married Elizabeth Stuyvesant Howard on October 18, 1920, in New York City. Following the death of his uncle, Alexander Kean, in 1922, Kean inherited an estate and mansion in Livingston, New Jersey, where they moved in 1924. They had six children: three sons, Robert, Hamilton and Thomas, and three daughters, Elizabeth, Rose and Katharine. His grandchildren include politician Thomas Kean Jr. and author Leslie Kean.

Kean died in Livingston on September 21, 1980, aged 86, at Saint Barnabas Medical Center due to a heart attack.

Honors
Kean University is named in honor of Robert Kean and the Kean family and its Liberty Hall Campus houses the historic property and home of the Kean family.

Electoral history

General Elections

Primary Elections

References

External links
 Retrieved on 2008-01-26

1893 births
1980 deaths
United States Army personnel of World War I
Harvard University alumni
St. Mark's School (Massachusetts) alumni
People from Livingston, New Jersey
Politicians from Long Branch, New Jersey
Recipients of the Distinguished Service Cross (United States)
United States Army officers
Robert
Recipients of the Silver Star
Republican Party members of the United States House of Representatives from New Jersey
20th-century American politicians
People from Monmouth County, New Jersey
Winthrop family